Brejninggaard is a former manor house located near Spjald, Ringkøbing-Skjern Municipality, in western Jutland, Denmark.

History
In the Middle Ages the estate belonged to the bishops of Ribe. In 1544, it was sold to the nobleman Gunde Lange. His son Hans Lange constructed a new main building later in the century. The main building has been extensively renovated and remodeled several times, so there are only a few remains of the original building.

Architecture
The main building  was erected around 1580 by in Renaissance-style red bricks and consisted of four built-in wings, with a tower with spiral staircase in the south-west corner of the courtyard.
The original house was a four-winged complex but only the east and north wings have survived. The east wing, which contains the gate, is decorated with a ceramic frieze and pilasters. Similar decorations have been found on the courtyard side of the north wig. This kind of terracotta decoration is common in northern Germany but unseen elsewhere in Denmark.

The land was sold off in lots in 1926. A new west wing was built in 1942 and followed by construction of the south wing between 1956-1959. The west wing from 1942 and the south wing from 1958 were both designed by architect Helge Holm.  The building were converted for use as a school. The building now houses Brejninggaard Efterskole.

References

External links
Brejninggaard Efterskole  website

Listed buildings and structures in Ringkøbing-Skjern Municipality
Listed castles and manor houses in Denmark